San Pietro is Italian for Saint Peter – see also Saint Peter (disambiguation).

It may also refer to:

Battles 
 Battle of San Pietro, fought in 1734
 Battle of San Pietro Infine, fought in 1943
 The Battle of San Pietro, 1945 film directed by John Huston

Churches 
 St. Peter's Basilica (Basilica di San Pietro in Vaticano)
 Old St. Peter's Basilica (Antica basilica di San Pietro in Vaticano)
 San Pietro di Castello (church), Venice
 San Pietro in Montorio
 San Pietro a Grado
 San Pietro, Perugia
 San Pietro in Vincoli

Places 
Italy
 San Pietro Island, off the coast of southwestern Sardinia, Italy
 San Pietro di Castello (island)
 Baratili San Pietro, in the province of Oristano
 Castel San Pietro Romano, in the Metropolitan City of Rome
 Castel San Pietro Terme, in the province of Bologna
 Ponte San Pietro, in the province of Bergamo
 San Pietro a Maida, in the province of Catanzaro
 San Pietro al Natisone, in the province of Udine
 San Pietro al Tanagro, in the province of Salerno
 San Pietro Apostolo, in the province of Catanzaro
 San Pietro Avellana, in the province of Isernia
 San Pietro, Bisenti, in the province of Teramo
 San Pietro Clarenza, in the province of Catania
 San Pietro di Cadore, in the province of Belluno
 San Pietro di Caridà, in the province of Reggio Calabria
 San Pietro di Feletto, in the province of Treviso
 San Pietro di Morubio, in the province of Verona
 San Pietro in Amantea, in the province of Cosenza
 San Pietro in Cariano, in the province of Verona
 San Pietro in Casale, in the province of Bologna
 San Pietro in Cerro, in the province of Piacenza
 San Pietro in Gu, in the province of Padua
 San Pietro in Guarano, in the province of Cosenza
 San Pietro in Lama, in the province of Lecce
 San Pietro Infine, in the province of Caserta
 San Pietro Mosezzo, in the province of Novara
 San Pietro Mussolino, in the province of Vicenza
 San Pietro Val Lemina, in the Metropolitan City of Turin
 San Pietro Vernotico, in the province of Brindisi
 San Pietro Viminario, in the province of Padua
 Settimo San Pietro, in the Province of Cagliari
 San Pietro (creek), in the Province of Imperia

Switzerland
 Castel San Pietro, in the canton of Ticino

Ships

Other uses
 Imperium: Saint Peter, a 2005 Italian TV film about St Peter, originally titled San Pietro

See also 
 Castel San Pietro (disambiguation)
 Santo Pietro, a village in Sicily